Yang Fengliang is a Chinese film director. He is best known for co-directing the Oscar-nominated film Ju Dou (1990) with Zhang Yimou.

References

External links

Chinese film directors
Living people
Year of birth missing (living people)
Place of birth missing (living people)